Thomas Cromwell, 3rd Earl of Ardglass (29 November 1653 – 11 April 1682), was an English nobleman, the only son of Wingfield Cromwell, 2nd Earl of Ardglass of Ilam, Staffordshire and Mary Russell. He held the subsidiary titles of 3rd Viscount Lecale and 6th Baron Cromwell of Oakham.

Life
He succeeded to the titles of 6th Baron Cromwell of Oakham, in the Peerage of England (1540), 3rd Viscount Lecale, in Ulster, in the Peerage of Ireland (1624) and 3rd Earl of Ardglass, in the Peerage of Ireland (1645) on 3 October 1668. On 29 of the same month and year he matriculated at Christ Church, University of Oxford. He married Honora Boyle (d. c. November 1710, buried 14 November 1710 St Patrick's Cathedral, Dublin, sister and co-heiress of Murrough Boyle, 1st Viscount Blesington, daughter of The Most Rev. Michael Boyle, DD, Archbishop of Armagh and Lord Chancellor of Ireland, without issue.

Death 
Thomas Cromwell died on 11 April 1682 and was buried at Ilam, Staffordshire. He was succeeded by his uncle Vere Essex Cromwell, 4th Earl of Ardglass. His widow Honora, married secondly, before 1687, Francis Cuffe (12 September 1656 – 26 December 1694), Member of Parliament for County Mayo in the Parliament of Ireland, son of Sir James Cuffe of Ballinrobe, County Mayo, and had issue, and married thirdly, c. 1700, as his first wife Captain Sir Thomas Burdett, 1st Baronet, of Garahill, County Carlow (14 September 1668 – 14 April 1727), without issue. She died on 14 April 1727 and was buried at St Patrick's Cathedral, Dublin

References

Bibliography

External links 
 Ardglass, Earl of (I, 1645 - 1687) Cracroft's Peerage

1653 births
1682 deaths
Alumni of Christ Church, Oxford
Thomas
Earls of Ardglass
Barons Cromwell